Feltia tricosa, the tricose dart, is a moth of the family Noctuidae. It is found in central North America, north to Quebec, Ontario and Manitoba.

The wingspan is about 35 mm. Adults are on wing from July to September in the north.

The larvae probably feed on a wide variety of plants.

External links
Bug Guide
Image
Species info

Noctuinae
Moths of North America
Moths described in 1874
Taxa named by Joseph Albert Lintner